The 2020–21 Algerian League Cup was the 4th season of the Algerian League Cup. The competition was open to all 20 clubs participating in the Algerian Ligue Professionnelle 1, Twenty years after it came back again due to the cancellation of the Algerian Cup. JS Kabylie won their first league cup title and qualified to the 2021–22 CAF Confederation Cup.

Rules and dates 
The FAF presented two variants to the members of the Federal Bureau who opted for the following system:
 The clubs concerned: the 20 teams of professional Ligue 1.
 The period of progress: this competition will start at the end of the first leg and after the transfer the mercato.
 The 4 clubs entered in the African Cups: in this case CR Belouizdad, MC Alger, ES Sétif and JS Kabylie, are exempt from the preliminary round.
 Eight clubs out of the remaining 16 will be drawn to play a preliminary round which will allow four teams to qualify.
 The four qualified clubs, plus the four exempted as well as the eight remaining, will play in the round of 16 after a draw.
 The following rounds will be contested in a classic way with a quarter-final, semi-finals and a final.
 The first club drawn will receive on its own ground and behind closed doors.

The competition started on 16 April 2021.

Preliminary round 
The Preliminary round and Round of 16 draw took place on 10 April at 11:00 a.m local time at Algerian Football Federation headquarters. The four Algerian teams engaged in continental competition MC Alger, CR Belouizdad, JS Kabylie and ES Sétif were exempted from this round.

Round of 16

Quarter-finals

Semi-finals

Final

Top goalscorers

Notes

References 

Algerian League Cup
Algerian League Cup
Algeria